Automat Pictures is an American film and television production company based in Los Angeles, focusing on the production of independent films, original television programming, EPK, and Blu-ray and DVD added value. It was founded in 2000 by producer/director Jeffrey Schwarz.

History and production

References

External links 
 Official website

Film production companies of the United States
Television production companies of the United States
Companies based in Los Angeles
Mass media companies established in 2000